David Lance Jarvis is an American college baseball coach, currently serving as head coach of the Belmont Bruins baseball team.  He was named to that position prior to the 1998 season.

Playing career
Jarvis played collegiately at Three Rivers Community College for two years before completing his eligibility at Arkansas State.  He was primarily a catcher, and also played a short semi-pro career before turning to coaching.  In 1985, he earned a master's degree at Arkansas State.

Coaching career
Three Rivers made Jarvis their head coach in 1985.  He remained with the Raiders for nine seasons, amassing a record of 324–152 at the junior college.  The program was consistently ranked under Jarvis, and he was named a three time Midwest Community College Athletic Conference Coach of the Year.  In 1994, Jarvis made the jump to Division I, serving as an assistant at Murray State, with responsibilities for hitters and catchers, and helping in recruiting the junior college ranks.  While at Belmont, he led the program into the NCAA and from the Atlantic Sun Conference to the Ohio Valley Conference.  The Bruins claimed A-Sun conference titles in 2011 and 2012, and appeared in the NCAA Regional Final against Vanderbilt in 2011.

Head coaching record
This table shows Jarvis' record as a head coach at the Division I level.

See also
List of current NCAA Division I baseball coaches

References

External links
Dave Jarvis Belmont Bruins bio

1959 births
Living people
Arkansas State
Belmont Bruins baseball coaches
Murray State Racers baseball coaches
Three Rivers Raiders baseball coaches
Three Rivers Raiders baseball players
People from Carter County, Missouri
Baseball coaches from Missouri